Chorisops maculiala is a species of soldier fly.

Distribution
Japan.

References

Stratiomyidae
Diptera of Asia
Insects described in 1964
Endemic fauna of Japan